Germany competed at the 2019 European Games, in Minsk, Belarus from 21 to 30 June 2019. Germany has previously competed at the 2015 European Games in Baku, Azerbaijan, where it won 66 medals, including sixteen golds.

Medalists 

| width="78%" align="left" valign="top" |

|width="30%" align=left valign=top|

Archery

Recurve

Compound

Athletics

Individual events

Team event

Badminton

Basketball 3x3

Team roster

Women
Svenja Brunckhorst
Ama Degbeon
Sonja Greinacher
Satou Sabally

Summary

Boxing

Men

Women

Canoe sprint

Men

Women

Cycling

Road
Men

Women

Judo

Men

Women

Mixed team

Karate

Kata

Kumite

Men

Women

Sambo

Men

Women

Shooting

Men

Women

Mixed team

Table tennis

Wrestling

Men's freestyle

Women's freestyle

Men's Greco-Roman

References

Nations at the 2019 European Games
European Games
2019